The 1966–67 UCLA Bruins men's basketball team won UCLA's third NCAA national championship under head coach John Wooden with a win over Dayton. The Bruins went undefeated, winning all 30 games.

In the NCAA West Regional at Corvallis, Oregon, the Bruins beat Wyoming (109–60) and Pacific   was played in Louisville, Kentucky, where UCLA defeated Houston (73–58) and Dayton (79–64).

The Bruins were led by starters Lynn Shackelford, Kenny Heitz, Lew Alcindor, Mike Warren, and Lucius Allen.

The Bruins entered the season ranked number 1, beginning what still stands today as the most consecutive weeks ranked in the AP poll. The streak ended at 221 weeks in January 1980.

Season summary
This was the season Lew Alcindor, later known as Kareem Abdul-Jabbar, debuted on to the college basketball scene. After playing on the freshman team under then NCAA rules, Alcindor dominated at the varsity level as a sophomore, leading UCLA to an undefeated  record while averaging 29.0 points and 15.5 rebounds. Three other players averaged in double figures, including sophomore guard Lucius Allen and junior Mike Warren.

Roster

Schedule

|-
!colspan=9 style=|Regular Season

|-
!colspan=12 style="background:#;"| NCAA Tournament

Rankings

Notes
 UCLA won the L.A. Classic by defeating Wisconsin, Georgia Tech, and USC.
 Bruins' third national championship in four years.
 The dunk was banned in college basketball after the season, primarily because of Alcindor's dominant use of the shot.

Awards and honors
 Lew Alcindor, NCAA basketball tournament MOP (1967)
 Lew Alcindor, USBWA College Player of the Year
 Lew Alcindor, Helms Foundation Player of the Year award
 Lew Alcindor, First Team All-American
 Lew Alcindor, School Record, Most season Points: 870 (1967)
 Lew Alcindor, School Record, Highest season Scoring Average: 29.0 (1967)
 Lew Alcindor, School Record,  Most season Field Goals: 346 (1967)
 Lew Alcindor, School Record,  Most season Free Throw Attempts: 274 (1967)
 Lew Alcindor, School Record, Most single game field goals: 26 (vs. Washington State, 2/25/67)

References

External links
1966–67 UCLA Bruins at Sports-Reference.com

Ucla Bruins
UCLA Bruins men's basketball seasons
NCAA Division I men's basketball tournament championship seasons
NCAA Division I men's basketball tournament Final Four seasons
Ucla
UCLA Bruins
UCLA Bruins